Pseudonocardia kunmingensis is a Gram-positive and aerobic bacterium from the genus of Pseudonocardia which has been isolated from the roots of the plant Artemisia annua in Kunming in China.

References

Pseudonocardia
Bacteria described in 2011